West Park, officially the City of West Park, is a municipality in Broward County, Florida, United States. It was created on March 1, 2005. It is located in the southeastern part of the county and consists of the neighborhoods of Carver Ranches, Lake Forest, Miami Gardens (Broward County), and Utopia. A large portion of the city lies west of the town of Pembroke Park, so the new city was called "West Park". The city has a population of 15,130 as of the 2020 census. The city is bordered by Miami-Dade County on the south, Pembroke Park on the east, Hollywood on the north and Miramar on the west.

History
The previously unincorporated neighborhoods of West Park embarked on the road to incorporation in 2004, after the Florida Legislature approved House Bill 1491, which provided for an election on November 2, 2004. Following a vote of 3,400 to 956 for incorporation, West Park was on its way to becoming Broward County's 31st city. After the election, residents elected an interim transition committee and held a series of workshops to gain input on the level of municipal-type services to be provided. It was decided that the new municipality would be known as West Park until a consensus was reached on a permanent name; this name was subsequently retained. On March 8, 2005, Eric H. Jones, Jr., was elected Mayor and four Commissioners were elected: Felicia M. Brunson, Thomas W. Dorsett, Sharon Fyffe and Rita "Peaches" Mack. They were sworn-in as the municipality's first elected leaders on March 10, 2005.

In 2011 West Park, received acknowledgement from the national non-profit organization KaBOOM!  As the city garnered the designation of a 2011 Playful City USA community. This recognition was given the city's effort to “increase play opportunities for children”.

Media
The city of West Park has its own newspaper, "The West Park News", which is published by and part of Miami Community Newspapers.

Demographics

2020 census

Note: the US Census treats Hispanic/Latino as an ethnic category. This table excludes Latinos from the racial categories and assigns them to a separate category. Hispanics/Latinos can be of any race.

2010 Census

As of 2000, before being annexed to West Park, the Carver Ranches neighborhood had English as a first language accounted for 96.90% of all residents, while Spanish accounted for 2.19%, and French Creole as a mother tongue made up 0.90% of the population.

As of 2000, before being annexed to West Park, the Lake Forest neighborhood had English as a first language accounted for 60.49% of all residents, while Spanish accounted for 34.79%, French Creole at 4.04%, and French as a mother tongue made up 0.67% of the population.

As of 2000, the Miami Gardens neighborhood, before being annexed to West Park, had Spanish as a first language accounted for 51.09% of all residents, while English accounted for 45.17%, and French Creole as a mother tongue made up 3.72% of the population.

As of 2000, before being annexed to West Park, the neighborhood of Utopia had English as a first language accounted for 80.62% of all residents, while Spanish as a mother tongue made up 19.37% of the population.

As of 2000, before West Park annexed it, the Miami Gardens neighborhood had the 103rd-highest percentage of Colombian residents in the US, with 1.63% of the US populace. The forty-fourth-highest percentage of Cuban residents in the US, at 9.76% of the city's population (tied with Key Largo,) the twenty-fourth-highest percentage of Dominicans in the US, with 4.62%, and the fifteenth-highest percentage of Jamaican residents in the US, at 6.3% of the city's population. It also had the forty-fourth-most Peruvians in the US, at 1.26% (tied with North Plainfield, New Jersey,) while it had the forty-fifth-highest percentage of Haitians (tied with Leisure City), at 3.6% of all residents. Also, West Park's Miami Gardens neighborhood had the sixty-first-highest percentage of Puerto Ricans, which was at an 11.2% populace. As of 2010, there were 4,711 households, out of which 8.0% were vacant.

Education
Residents are zoned to schools in Broward County Public Schools:
 A portion of the town is zoned to Lake Forest Elementary School, and a portion is zoned to Watkins Elementary School.
 McNichol Middle School
 Hallandale High School

References

External links
 City of West Park official website

Cities in Broward County, Florida
Cities in Florida